Two Kings may refer to:
 Two Kings (book series), by Fishel Jacobs
 The Two Kings an expansion pack for The Settlers 7: Paths to a Kingdom
 2 Kings, a book of the Christian Old Testament
 2 Kings (album), an album by Nigerian rappers Olamide and Phyno
 Er Wang (disambiguation)